Mother and Child is a song cycle for soprano and piano composed in 1918 by John Ireland (18791962). It consists of settings of eight poems by Christina Rossetti (183094), from her collection Sing-Song: A Nursery Rhyme Book (1872, 1893).

A typical performance takes about 10 minutes. The songs are:

 "Newborn"
 "The Only child"
 "Hope"
 "Skylark and Nightingale"
 "The Blind Boy"
 "Baby"
 "Death Parting"
 "The Garland"

References 

Song cycles by John Ireland
Classical song cycles in English
1918 compositions
Musical settings of poems by Christina Rossetti